

Events

Works published
  by Bonifaci VI de Castellana, an attack on clerics, Henry III of England, and James I of Aragon
 Arnaut Catalan and Alfonso X of Castile compose a tenso in which the former uses Occitan and the latter Galician-Portuguese

Births

Deaths

13th-century poetry
Poetry